The Velvet Underground & Nico is the debut album by the American rock band the Velvet Underground and German singer Nico, released in March 1967 through Verve Records. It was recorded in 1966 while the band were featured on Andy Warhol's Exploding Plastic Inevitable tour. The album features experimental performance sensibilities and controversial lyrical topics, including drug abuse, prostitution, sadomasochism and sexual deviancy. 

The Velvet Underground & Nico initially sold poorly and was mostly ignored by music critics at the time, but later became regarded as one of the most influential albums in rock and pop music. Described as "the original art-rock record", it was a major influence on many subgenres of rock music and alternative music, including punk, garage, krautrock, post-punk, shoegaze, goth, and indie. In 1982, English musician Brian Eno quipped that while the album only sold approximately 30,000 copies in its first five years, "everyone who bought one of those 30,000 copies started a band". In 2003, it ranked 13th on Rolling Stone magazine's list of the "500 Greatest Albums of All Time", and in 2006, it was inducted into the National Recording Registry by the Library of Congress.

Recording

The Velvet Underground & Nico was recorded with the first professional line-up of the Velvet Underground: Lou Reed, John Cale, Sterling Morrison and Maureen Tucker. At the instigation of their mentor and manager Andy Warhol, and his collaborator Paul Morrissey, German singer Nico was also featured; she had occasionally performed lead vocals for the band. She sang lead on three of the album's tracks—"Femme Fatale", "All Tomorrow's Parties" and "I'll Be Your Mirror"—and back-up on "Sunday Morning". In 1966, as the album was being recorded, this was also the line-up for their live performances as a part of Warhol's Exploding Plastic Inevitable.

The bulk of the songs that would become The Velvet Underground & Nico were recorded in four days in mid-April 1966 at Scepter Studios, a run-down recording studio in Manhattan. This was financed by Warhol and Columbia Records' sales executive Norman Dolph, who also acted as an engineer with John Licata. The cost of the project is unknown. Estimates vary from $1,500 (US$ in  dollars) to $3,000 (US$ in  dollars).

Soon after, Dolph sent an acetate disc of the recordings to Columbia Records in an attempt to interest them in distributing the album, but they declined, as did Atlantic Records and Elektra Records—according to Morrison, Atlantic objected to the references to drugs in Reed's songs, while Elektra disliked Cale's viola. Finally, the MGM Records-owned Verve Records accepted the recordings, with the help of Verve staff producer Tom Wilson who had recently moved from a job at Columbia.

With the backing of a label, one month later in May 1966 three of the songs, "I'm Waiting for the Man", "Venus in Furs" and "Heroin", were re-recorded in two days at TTG Studios during a stay in Hollywood. When the record's release date was postponed, Wilson brought the band into Mayfair Recording Studios in Manhattan in November 1966, to add a final song to the album: the single "Sunday Morning".

Production

Although Andy Warhol is the only formally credited producer, he had little influence beyond paying for the recording sessions. Several others who worked on the album are often mentioned as the technical producer.

Norman Dolph and John Licata are sometimes attributed to producing the Scepter Studios sessions, as they were responsible for recording and engineering, though neither is credited. Dolph said Cale was the creative producer, as he handled the majority of the arrangements. However Cale recalled that Tom Wilson produced nearly all the tracks, and said that Warhol "didn't do anything". Reed also said the "real producer" of the album was Wilson. Reed claimed it was MGM who decided to bring in Wilson, and credited him for producing songs such as "Sunday Morning": "Andy absorbed all the flak. Then MGM said they wanted to bring in a real producer, Tom Wilson. So that's how you got 'Sunday Morning', with all those overdubs – the viola in the back, Nico chanting. But he couldn't undo what had already been done."

However Sterling Morrison and Lou Reed both cited Warhol's lack of manipulation as a legitimate method of production. Morrison described Warhol as the producer "in the sense of producing a film". Reed said:

Music and lyrics

Themes
The Velvet Underground & Nico was notable for its overt descriptions of topics such as drug abuse, prostitution, sadism and masochism and sexual deviancy. "I'm Waiting for the Man" describes a protagonist's efforts to obtain heroin, while "Venus in Furs" is a nearly literal interpretation of the 19th century novel of the same name (which itself prominently features accounts of BDSM). "Heroin" details an individual's use of the drug and the experience of feeling its effects.

Lou Reed, who wrote the majority of the album's lyrics, never intended to write about such topics for shock value. Reed, a fan of poets and authors such as Raymond Chandler, Nelson Algren, William S. Burroughs, Allen Ginsberg, and Hubert Selby, Jr., saw no reason the content in their works could not translate well to rock and roll music. An English major who studied for a B.A. at Syracuse University, Reed said in an interview that he thought joining the two (gritty subject matter and music) was "obvious". "That's the kind of stuff you might read. Why wouldn't you listen to it? You have the fun of reading that, and you get the fun of rock on top of it."

Though the album's dark subject matter is today considered revolutionary, several of the album's songs are centered on themes more typical of popular music. Certain songs were written by Reed as observations of the members of Andy Warhol's "Factory superstars". "Femme Fatale" in particular was written about Edie Sedgwick at Warhol's request. "I'll Be Your Mirror", inspired by Nico, is a tender and affectionate song; in stark contrast to a song like "Heroin". A common misperception is that "All Tomorrow's Parties" was written by Reed at Warhol's request (as stated in Victor Bockris and Gerard Malanga's Velvet Underground biography Up-Tight: The Velvet Underground Story). While the song does seem to be another observation of Factory denizens, Reed wrote the song before meeting Warhol, having recorded a demo in July 1965 at Ludlow Street. It had folk music sounds, which were possibly inspired by Bob Dylan.

Instrumentation and performance

Musically, The Velvet Underground & Nico has generally been described by writers as art rock, experimental rock, proto-punk, psychedelic rock, and avant-pop. Much of the album's sound was conceived by John Cale, who stressed the experimental qualities of the band. He was influenced greatly by his work with La Monte Young, John Cage and the early Fluxus movement, and encouraged the use of alternative ways of producing sound in music. Cale thought his sensibilities meshed well with Lou Reed's, who was already experimenting with alternate tunings. For instance, Reed had "invented" the ostrich guitar tuning for a song he wrote called "The Ostrich" for the short-lived band the Primitives. Ostrich guitar tuning consists of all strings being tuned to the same note. This method was utilized on the songs "Venus in Furs" and "All Tomorrow's Parties". Often, the guitars were also tuned down a whole step, which produced a lower, fuller sound that Cale considered "sexy".

Cale's viola was used on several of the album's songs, notably "Venus in Furs" and "Black Angel's Death Song". The viola used guitar and mandolin strings, and when played loudly, Cale would liken its sound to that of an airplane engine. Cale's technique usually involved drones, detuning and distortion. According to Robert Christgau, the "narcotic drone" not only sustains the sadomasochism-themed "Venus in Furs", but it also "identifies and unifies the [album] musically". Of the vocal performances, he believed "Nico's contained chantoozy sexuality" complemented "the dispassionate abandon of Reed's chant singing".  In 1966, Richard Goldstein described Nico's vocal as "something like a cello getting up in the morning".

Artwork
The album cover for The Velvet Underground & Nico is recognizable for featuring a Warhol print of a banana. Early copies of the album invited the owner to "Peel slowly and see", and peeling back the banana skin revealed a flesh-colored banana underneath. A special machine was needed to manufacture these covers (one of the causes of the album's delayed release), but MGM paid for costs figuring that any ties to Warhol would boost sales of the album. Most reissued vinyl editions of the album do not feature the peel-off sticker; original copies of the album with the peel-sticker feature are now rare collector's items. A Japanese re-issue LP in the early 1980s was the only re-issue version to include the banana sticker for many years. On the 1996 CD reissue, the banana image is on the front cover while the image of the peeled banana is on the inside of the jewel case, beneath the CD itself. The album was re-pressed onto heavyweight vinyl in 2008, featuring a banana sticker.

Back cover lawsuit

When the album was first issued, the main back cover photo (taken at a performance of Warhol's event Exploding Plastic Inevitable) contained an image of actor Eric Emerson projected upside-down on the wall behind the band. Having recently been arrested for drug possession and desperate for money, Emerson threatened to sue over this unauthorized use of his image, unless he was paid. Rather than complying, MGM recalled copies of the album and halted its distribution until Emerson's image could be airbrushed from the photo on subsequent pressings. Copies that had already been printed were sold with a large black sticker covering the actor's image.

Front cover lawsuit
In January 2012, the "Velvet Underground" business partnership (of which John Cale and Lou Reed were general partners) sued The Andy Warhol Foundation for the Visual Arts, Inc. in the United States District Court for the Southern District of New York after the Foundation licensed the cover's banana design to Incase Designs for use on a line of iPhone and iPad cases. The complaint involved copyright infringement, trademark infringement and unfair competition. 

Alleging that the Foundation had earlier claimed it "may" own the design's copyright, the partnership asked the court for a declaratory judgment that the Foundation did not have such rights. In response, the Foundation gave the partnership a "Covenant Not to Sue"—a written and binding promise that, even if the partnership and certain other parties continued to use the design commercially, the Foundation would never invoke its professed copyright ownership against them in court.

On the Foundation's motion, Judge Alison J. Nathan severed and dismissed from the lawsuit the partnership's copyright claim. According to Judge Nathan, the Constitution allows federal courts to decide only "Cases" or "Controversies", which means ongoing or imminent disputes over legal rights, involving concrete facts and specific acts, that require court intervention in order to shield the plaintiff from harm or interference with its rights. The judge held that the partnership's complaint fell short of that standard because even if the Foundation continued to claim ownership of the design's copyright—and even if its claim was invalid—that claim would not legally harm the partnership or prevent it from making its own lawful uses of the design. The partnership did not claim that it owned the design's copyright, only that the Foundation did not. Since, according to the court, the Foundation promised not to sue the partnership for any "potentially copyright-infringing uses of the Banana Design", the partnership could continue using the design and there would be no legal action that the Foundation could take (under copyright law) to stop it. And if, the court concluded, the partnership could continue with business as usual (as far as copyright was concerned) regardless of whether the Foundation actually owned the design's copyright, a court decision would have no practical consequences for the partnership; it would be a purely academic (or "advisory") opinion, which federal courts may not issue. The court therefore "dismissed without prejudice" the partnership's request that it resolve whether the Foundation owned the design's copyright. The remaining trademark claims were settled out of court with a confidential agreement, and the partnership's suit was dismissed in late May 2013.

Reception and sales

Chart history and sales figures
Upon release, The Velvet Underground & Nico was largely unsuccessful and a financial failure. The album's controversial content led to its almost instantaneous ban from various record stores, many radio stations refused to play it, and magazines refused to carry advertisements for it. Its lack of success can also be attributed to Verve, who failed to promote or distribute the album with anything but modest attention. However, Richie Unterberger of AllMusic also notes that:

The album first entered the Billboard album charts on May 13, 1967, at number 199 and left the charts on June 10, 1967, at number 195. When Verve recalled the album in June due to Eric Emerson's lawsuit, it disappeared from the charts for five months. It then re-entered the charts on November 18, 1967, at number 182, peaked at number 171 on December 16, 1967, and finally left the charts on January 6, 1968, at number 193.

Musician Brian Eno famously stated in 1982 that while the album only sold approximately 30,000 copies in its first five years, "everyone who bought one of those 30,000 copies started a band!" Writers often use this quotation as a definitive figure for how many copies of The Velvet Underground & Nico were sold in the first several years. While it indeed sold less than Warhol and the band had hoped, according to a MGM royalty statement gifted to Jeff Gold, a former Warner Bros. Records executive, 58,476 copies of the album sold through February 1969—a decent figure for a late-1960s  LP.

Contemporary reception
A capsule review from Billboard published ahead of the album's release praised the "haunting" vocals of Nico and the "powerful" lyrics of the band, calling it a collection of "sophisticated folk-rock" and a "left-fielder which could click in a big way." Vibrations, a small rock music magazine, gave the album a mostly positive review in their second issue, describing the music as "a full-fledged attack on the ears and on the brain" while noting the dark lyrics. Wayne Harada of the Honolulu Advertiser and Dave Donelly of the Honolulu Star-Bulletin both praised the album's banana-sticker cover; the former terming it "the wildest" front cover of any album yet and the latter calling it a conversation piece. Harada wrote: "Inside, the eating's good, too: 'Sunday Morning' has a definite psychedelic hit sound. 'Run Run Run' still is another Underground gem gaining ground." Donelly called the album "not Commercial with a capitol 'C' but an experience in sound." An anonymous reviewer in the American Record Guide praised Reed's lyrics as "penetratingly contemporary", comparing them to the work of Dylan while calling Reed on the basis of the record "an important new (to me) talent". The reviewer also praised the variety in sounds presented by "Sunday Morning", "European Son", and "Heroin" alongside from the more Dylan-esque songs.

Meanwhile Richard Goldstein of the Village Voice, published in Velvet Underground's hometown of New York City, was more reserved in his praise. Goldstein called "There She Goes Again" a "blatant" lift of the Rolling Stones rendition of "Hitch Hike" and called Reed's vocal performances on other songs "distressingly like early Dylan". However he ultimately wrote that "the Velvets are an important group and this album has some major work [within]", singling out "I'm Waiting for the Man", "Venus in Furs", "Femme Fatale", and "Heroin". Of the latter song, Goldstein wrote:

The Tampa Tribune writer Vance Johnston dismissed it as a collection  of "several confusing sounds... most depressing and whatever the message I failed to get" but wrote that Warhol aficionados would declare it his best "at any rate". Don Lass of New Jersey's Asbury Park Evening Press was similarly dismissive, finding the music "as lifeless and inanimate as the discarded banana peel, touching every cliche in the rock 'n' roll spectrum while missing the genuine fun that good big-beat renderings can offer." A staff writer for the Pensacola News Journal defined the album overall as "one big savage sound", with its lyrics "equally frenzied": "The result sounds like the merger of Dracula and some of the long-haired wailers of today". John F. Szwed of Jazz & Pop called the band's performance on the record "tedious despite their ventures into electric viola et al", acknowledging the strength of their "loud whine" but ultimately writing that "something is lost in the translation" in the absence of the visual accompaniments of Exploding Plastic Inevitable.

Reappraisal

A decade after its release, The Velvet Underground & Nico began to attract wide praise from rock critics. Christgau wrote in his 1977 retrospective review for the Village Voice that the record had been difficult to understand in 1967, "which is probably why people are still learning from it. It sounds intermittently crude, thin, and pretentious at first, but it never stops getting better." He later included it in his "Basic Record Library" of 1950s and 1960s recordings, published in Christgau's Record Guide: Rock Albums of the Seventies (1981).

In The Encyclopedia of Popular Music (1998), Colin Larkin called it a "powerful collection" that "introduced Reed's decidedly urban infatuations, a fascination for street culture and amorality bordering on voyeurism." In April 2003, Spin led their "Top Fifteen Most Influential Albums of All Time" list with the album. On November 12, 2000, NPR included it in their "NPR 100" series of "the most important American musical works of the 20th century". In 2003, Rolling Stone placed it at number 13 on their list of the 500 Greatest Albums Of All Time, maintaining the rating in a 2012 revised list, calling it the "most prophetic rock album ever made". It re-ranked at number 23 in a 2020 reboot of the list.

In 1997, The Velvet Underground & Nico was named the 22nd greatest album of all time in a "Music of the Millennium" poll conducted in the United Kingdom by HMV Group, Channel 4, The Guardian and Classic FM. In 2006, Q magazine readers voted it into 42nd place in the "2006 Q Magazine Readers' 100 Greatest Albums Ever" poll, while The Observer placed it at number 1 in a list of "50 Albums That Changed Music" in July of that year. Also in 2006, the album was chosen by Time magazine as one of the 100 best albums of all time. In 2017, Pitchfork placed the album at number 1 on its list of "The 200 Best Albums of the 1960s". It was voted number 13 in Colin Larkin's All Time Top 1000 Albums 3rd Edition (2000).

Cover versions
In April 1967, one month after the album's release, a band called the Electrical Banana may have recorded the first cover version of "There She Goes Again". According to bandmember Dean Ellis Kohler, they recorded it in a tent in Vietnam in April 1967 and sent the master tape to a company in California to have 45 RPM records pressed.

Also in 1967 the Dutch band The Riats from The Hague released a single with "Run, Run, Run" as the A-side and "Sunday Morning" as B-side. The exact release date is unknown, so it remains open for debate whether Electric Banana or The Riats were the first to put a Velvet Underground cover on record.

In 2009, the American musician Beck recorded a track-for-track cover of The Velvet Underground & Nico and released it online in video form on his website, as part of a project called Record Club. Musicians involved in the recording include Beck plus Nigel Godrich, Joey Waronker, Brian LeBarton, Bram Inscore, Yo, Giovanni Ribisi, Chris Holmes, and Þórunn Magnúsdóttir.

Also in 2009, various artists from Argentina collaborated to produce a track-for-track cover of the record. They played a number of concerts in Buenos Aires to celebrate the release of the album, which was made available online for free.

In 2021, Verve Records released the tribute album I'll Be Your Mirror: A Tribute to The Velvet Underground & Nico, a track-by-track cover of the album with performances by St. Vincent, Sharon Van Etten, Bobby Gillespie, and Iggy Pop among others.

Aftermath
Frustrated by the album's year-long delay and unsuccessful release, Lou Reed's relationship with Andy Warhol grew tense. Reed fired Warhol as manager in favor of Steve Sesnick, who convinced the group to move towards a more commercial direction. Nico was forced out of the group, and began a career as a solo artist. Her debut solo album, Chelsea Girl, was released in October 1967, featuring some songs written by Velvet Underground members.

Tom Wilson continued working with the Velvet Underground, producing their 1968 album White Light/White Heat and Nico's Chelsea Girl.

Track listing
All songs written by Lou Reed, except where noted.

Personnel
According to author Peter Hogan:

John Cale electric viola, bass, piano
Sterling Morrison rhythm guitar, bass
Lou Reed vocals, lead guitar, ostrich guitar
Maureen Tucker drums
Nico vocals

Production
Andy Warhol producer
Tom Wilson producer
Norman Dolph engineer
Omi Haden engineer
John Licata engineer

Reissues and deluxe editions

Compact disc
The first CD edition of the album was released in 1986 and featured slight changes. The title of the album was featured on the cover, unlike the original LP release. In addition, the album contained an alternate mix of "All Tomorrow's Parties" which featured a single track of lead vocals as opposed to the double-tracked vocal version on the original LP. Apparently, the decision to use the double-tracked version on the original LP was made at the last minute. Bill Levenson, who was overseeing the initial CD issues of the VU's Verve/MGM catalog, wanted to keep the single-voice version a secret as a surprise to fans, but was dismayed to find out that the alternate version was revealed as such on the CD's back cover (and noted as "previously unreleased").

The subsequent 1996 remastered CD reissue removed these changes, keeping the original album art and double-tracked mix of "All Tomorrow's Parties" found on the LP.

Peel Slowly and See box set
The Velvet Underground & Nico was released in its entirety on the five-year spanning box set, Peel Slowly and See, in 1995. The album was featured on the second disc of the set along with the single version of "All Tomorrow's Parties", two Nico tracks from Chelsea Girl and a ten-minute excerpt of the 45-minute "Melody Laughter" performance. Also included in the set (on the first disc) are the band's 1965 Ludlow Street loft demos. Among these demos are early versions of "Venus in Furs", "Heroin", "I'm Waiting for the Man" and "All Tomorrow's Parties".

Deluxe edition
In 2002, Universal released a two-disc "Deluxe Edition" set containing the stereo version of the album along with the five tracks from Nico's Chelsea Girl written by members of the band on disc one, and the mono version of the album along with the mono single mixes of "All Tomorrow's Parties" and "Sunday Morning" and their B-sides "I'll Be Your Mirror" and "Femme Fatale" on disc two. A studio demo of the unreleased track "Miss Joanie Lee" had been planned for inclusion on the set, but a dispute over royalties between the band and Universal canceled these plans. This contractual dispute apparently also led to the cancellation of further installments of the band's official Bootleg Series. However, this track was included in the subsequent re-release, 45th Anniversary Super Deluxe Edition. In April 2010, Universal re-released the second disc of the "Deluxe Edition" as a single CD "Rarities Edition".

45th Anniversary Super Deluxe edition
On October 1, 2012, Universal released a 6-CD box set of the album. It features the previously available mono and stereo mixes as discs one and two respectively. Disc one contains as bonus tracks additional alternate versions of "All Tomorrow's Parties", "European Son", "Heroin", "All Tomorrow's Parties" (alternate instrumental version), and "I'll Be Your Mirror". Disc two contains the same bonus tracks as the prior deluxe version's second disc. Disc three is Nico's Chelsea Girl in its entirety and the Scepter Studios acetate (see below) in its entirety occupies disc 4. Discs 5 and 6 contain a previously unreleased live performance from 1966. According to the essay by music critic and historian Richie Unterberger contained within the set, the source for the show is the only audio tape of acceptable quality recording during singer Nico's tenure in the band. The essay also clarifies that the absence of any DVD materials in the box set is due to the fact that none of the band's shows were filmed, in spite of their heavy reliance on multimedia visuals.

Scepter Studios acetate version

Norman Dolph's original acetate recording of the Scepter Studios material contains several recordings that would make it onto the final album, though many are different mixes of those recordings and three are different takes entirely. The acetate was cut on April 25, 1966, shortly after the recording sessions. It resurfaced decades later when it was bought by collector Warren Hill of Montreal, Quebec, Canada in September 2002 at a flea market in the Chelsea neighborhood of New York City for $0.75. Hill put the album up for auction on eBay in November. On December 8, 2006, a winning bid for $155,401 was placed, but not honored. The album was again placed for auction on eBay and was successfully sold on December 16, 2006, for $25,200.

Although ten songs were recorded during the Scepter sessions, only nine appear on the acetate cut. Dolph recalls "There She Goes Again" being the missing song (and, indeed, the version of "There She Goes Again" that appears on the final LP is attributed to the Scepter Studios session). In 2012, the acetate was officially released as disc 4 of the omnicomprehensive "45th Anniversary Super Deluxe Edition" box set of the album (see above). The disc also includes six previously unreleased bonus tracks, recorded during the band's rehearsals at The Factory on January 3, 1966. However, a ripped version of the acetate began circulating the internet in January 2007. Bootleg versions of the acetate tracks have also become available on vinyl and CD. The acetate was issued on vinyl in 2013 as a limited edition for Record Store Day. In 2014, it went back to auction.

Box set, disc 4 track listing
 "European Son" (Alternate version) – 9:02
 "The Black Angel's Death Song" (Alternate mix) – 3:16
 "All Tomorrow's Parties" (Alternate version) – 5:53
 "I'll Be Your Mirror" (Alternate mix) – 2:11
 "Heroin" (Alternate version) – 6:16
 "Femme Fatale" (Alternate mix) – 2:36
 "Venus in Furs" (Alternate version) – 4:29
 "I'm Waiting for the Man" (Alternate version, here titled "Waiting for the Man") – 4:10
 "Run Run Run" (Alternate mix) – 4:23
 "Walk Alone" – 3:27
 "Crackin' Up/Venus in Furs" – 3:52
 "Miss Joanie Lee" – 11:49
 "Heroin" – 6:14
 "There She Goes Again" (with Nico) – 2:09
 "There She Goes Again" – 2:56

Notes
 Tracks 1–9 are the original Scepter Studios acetate. Tracks 1, 2, 3, and 5 are sourced from tape; tracks 4, 6, 7, 8, and 9 are from the actual acetate.
 Tracks 10–15 are the January 3, 1966, Factory rehearsals, also from tape, previously unreleased.

Charts and certifications

Peak positions

Certifications

According to Nielsen SoundScan, which tracks sales, The Velvet Underground & Nico has sold 560,000 copies since 1991.

Notes

References

Bibliography

External links
 
 800 Copies: Meet the World's Most Obsessive Fan of The Velvet Underground and Nico from NPR
 The Velvet Underground & Nico at 50: Monumental Album or Just "Fine"? from The A.V. Club

1967 debut albums
Albums produced by Andy Warhol
Albums produced by Tom Wilson (record producer)
Albums with cover art by Andy Warhol
Art rock albums by American artists
Collaborative albums
Nico albums
Protopunk albums
United States National Recording Registry recordings
The Velvet Underground albums
Verve Records albums
Experimental rock albums
Avant-pop albums
United States National Recording Registry albums